Clarke Schools for Hearing and Speech (formerly Clarke School for the Deaf) is a national nonprofit organization that specializes in educating children who are deaf or hard of hearing using listening and spoken language (oralism) through the assistance of hearing technology such as hearing aids and cochlear implants. Clarke's five campuses serve more than 1,000 students annually in Canton, Massachusetts, Jacksonville, Florida, New York City, Northampton, Massachusetts, and Bryn Mawr, Pennsylvania.  Clarke is the first and largest organization of its kind in the U.S.  Its Northampton campus was listed on the National Register of Historic Places in 2022.

Introduction 

Clarke School for the Deaf was founded in 1867 in Northampton, Massachusetts, as the first permanent oral school for the deaf in the United States. In the first quarter of 2010, Clarke announced the new name from Clarke School for the Deaf to Clarke Schools for Hearing and Speech. 

In the present day, Clarke's operates from five locations:
 Clarke Boston in Canton, Massachusetts
 Clarke Florida in Jacksonville, Florida
 Clarke New York in New York City
 Clarke Northampton in Northampton, Massachusetts
 Clarke Philadelphia in Bryn Mawr, Pennsylvania

Media 

In 2007, Clarke School was featured in the PBS documentary, "Through Deaf Eyes" produced by Larry Hott. The documentary depicted deafness and Deaf culture in the United States and the choices parents face between sign language and oral language.

Notable people
 Ella Seaver Owen (1852–1910), artist, teacher
 Grace Coolidge, (1879–1957) First lady of the United States, teacher

References

External links 
 

1867 establishments in Massachusetts
Alexander Graham Bell
Buildings and structures in Northampton, Massachusetts
Educational institutions established in 1867
Schools for the deaf in Massachusetts
Schools in Hampshire County, Massachusetts
National Register of Historic Places in Hampshire County, Massachusetts